Bracken is an unincorporated community in Warren Township, Huntington County, Indiana.

Bracken, formerly called Claysville, was founded in the 1850s.

Geography

References

Unincorporated communities in Huntington County, Indiana
Unincorporated communities in Indiana